George Ward Cole F.R.G.S., Commander R.N. (15 November 1793 – 26 April 1879) was a Royal Navy officer and politician in Australia, member of the Victorian Legislative Council.

Cole was the fourth son of John Cole, of Durham, and was born at Lumley Castle, in that county. He entered the Royal Navy in October 1807, and served with distinction in various parts of the world, being on several occasions severely wounded. Having been placed on half-pay in October. 1817, Captain Cole went into the merchant service, and commanded several vessels of which he was part owner. After numerous adventurous voyages, and engaging in various speculations, Captain Cole in 1839 decided to settle in Sydney, and purchased land there; but, after a visit to England, he changed his intention, and made his home in Victoria where he arrived in July 1840, and started business in Melbourne. In the following year he purchased land on the Yarra River, and constructed the well-known Cole's Wharf in Flinders Street West, where Hugh Childers acted as a tally-clerk on his first arrival in the colony.  For a few years he held property in the Pyrenees, on land later known as Mount Cole. In 1851 Captain Cole built the City of Melbourne, the first screw steamer seen south of the equator.

Captain Cole represented Gipps' Land in the old unicameral Legislative Council from 1853 to 1855, when he resigned with the object of revisiting England. In October 1859 Cole was elected to the Council for the Central Province, and was re-elected for ten years in 1860 and 1870 respectively. Captain Cole, who was a Protectionist, represented the James McCulloch Government in the Upper House during the long and embittered struggle with the Victorian Legislative Assembly over the tacks to the Appropriation Bill from June 1863 to May 1868; and in November 1867 was sworn of the Executive Council. Captain Cole died on 26 April 1879.

See also

References

 

1793 births
1879 deaths
Members of the Victorian Legislative Council
People from Chester-le-Street
English emigrants to Australia
19th-century Australian politicians
Settlers of Melbourne
Settlers of Victoria (Australia)